The 1989 Danone Hardcourt Championships was a women's tennis tournament played on outdoor hard courts at the Milton Tennis Centre in Brisbane in Australia and was part of the Category 2 tier of the 1989 WTA Tour. The tournament ran from 2 through 8 January 1989. First-seeded Helena Suková won the singles title.

Finals

Singles

 Helena Suková defeated  Brenda Schultz 7–6(8–6), 7–6(8–6)
 It was Suková's 1st singles title of the year and the 7th of her career.

Doubles

 Jana Novotná /  Helena Suková defeated  Patty Fendick /  Jill Hetherington 6–7(4–7), 6–1, 6–2
 It was Novotná's 1st title of the year and the 13th of her career. It was Suková's 2nd title of the year and the 34th of her career.

References

External links
 WTA tournament draws
 ITF tournament draws

Danone Hardcourt Championships
Danone Hardcourt Championships
Dan
Danone Hardcourt Championships, 1989
Danone Hardcourt Championships
Sports competitions in Brisbane
Tennis in Queensland